Zmiennicy (English: Subs) is a  Polish comedy TV series completed in 1986 and aired in 1987. Many famous Polish actors (not only comedians) appear in Zmiennicy.

Synopsis
A young man Jacek Żytkiewicz is an employee of a fictional company WPT (the Warsaw Taxi Company) and drives a blue taxicab no. 1313 in turns with his sub Stanisław Lesiak. In an idiosyncratic accident the blue cab is destroyed and Stanisław lands in a hospital.

Simultaneously a young woman, Kasia Piórecka, is a driver in a small enterprise. After an abuse attempt she resigns from a job she never liked and applies to be a taxi driver for WPT but her application is rejected due to safety concerns. At that time, the taxi driver was exclusively a male job in Poland and with several attacks on or even murders of taxi drivers it was believed that a woman might be even more prone to be attacked. This doesn't stop Kasia, and again, disguised as a man named Marian Koniuszko, she tries and becomes employed in WPT. She, being Marian (a male name in Polish), becomes a new sub of Jacek in a new, yellow painted taxicab no. 1313.

Living a double life is a complicated endeavour. At certain point Jacek meets Kasia en femme, falls in love and starts dating her. Jacek is unaware that a girl he dates is the same person who is his sub. Kasia is still not willing to reveal her double identity fearing losing her job. This state leads to many complicated situations. Things get even worse when it happens that the yellow 1313 cab is a key instrument in a large heroin-smuggling plot and two rival gangs will try anything to regain the car at any cost.

Episodes
Ceny umowne (Conventional Prices)
Ostatni kurs (The Last Run)
Dziewczyna do bicia (The Girl for Beating)
Typowa logika damsko-męska (A Typical Logic of Males and Females)
Safari (Safari)
Prasa szczególnej troski (Special-Care Press)
Warszawski łącznik (The Warsaw Middleman)
Fartowny dzień (Lucky Day)
Podróż sentymentalna (Sentimental Trip)
Krzyk ciszy (Scream of Silence)
Antycypacja (Anticipation)
Obywatel Monte Christo (Citizen Monte Christo)
Spotkania z Temidą (Meetings With Themis)
Pocałuj mnie Kasiu (Kiss Me, Kate)
Nasz najdroższy (Our Precious)

Credits

Cast
 Ewa Błaszczyk - Katarzyna Piórecka/Marian Koniuszko
 Mieczysław Hryniewicz - Jacek Żytkiewicz
 Bronisław Pawlik - Stanisław Lesiak
 Piotr Pręgowski - Krashan Bhamradżanga
 Irena Kwiatkowska - Kasias mother
 Kazimierz Kaczor - Zenon Kuśmider
 Wojciech Pokora - Antoni Klusek
 Jerzy Przybylski - Hans Gonschorek
 Krzysztof Kowalewski - Tomasz Michalik
 Marian Opania - Ceglarek
 Artur Barciś - Wiesio Ceglarek
 Dariusz Kowalski - Adam Kuberski
 Stanisława Celińska - Lusia Walicka
 Mariusz Benoit - Jan Oborniak
 Marzena Trybała - Oborniakowa
 Krzysztof Zaleski - Łukasik
 Stanisław Bareja - Krokodylowy (Crocodile Man)
 Ignacy Machowski - Kasias father
 Marcel Szytenchelm - Marian Koniuszko
 Mariusz Dmochowski - Tadeusz Koniuszko
 Janusz Rewiński - Mroczkowski
 Krystyna Kołodziejczyk - Koniuszkowa
 Zdzisław Wardejn - Waldemar Barewicz
 Jan Englert - Rawicz
 Włodzimierz Stępiński - Mr. Andrzej's man
 Mieczysław Czechowicz - Mastalerz
 Daniel Kozakiewicz - Kasias brother
 Gustaw Lutkiewicz - Samelko
 Adam Ferency - police officer Borkowski
 Jerzy Markuszewski - WPT manager
 Jan Kobuszewski - Ksywa
 Cezary Harasimowicz - Wojtek, Kluska's driver
 Zbigniew Zamachowski - Henio's brother
 Anna Gornostaj - Maria Grzybianka
 Tomasz Dedek - Mr. Andrzej, pimp
 Zdzisław Rychter - waiter from Kutno
 Krystyna Tkacz - Michalikowa
 Katarzyna Skawina - Flora, Michalik's lover
 Anna Sobik - Marysia, WPT controller
 Alicja Migulanka - Ołtarzewska
 Wojciech Jastrzębowski - TVP operator in Thailand
 Wiesław Znyk - TVP soundman in Thailand
 Hanna Lachmann - Lesiakowa
 Marek Siudym - Stefan Parzydlak
 Stefan Friedmann - senior lecturer form Alternatywy 4 Street
 Leopold Matuszczak - Kalina, customs officer from Okęcie
 Antonina Girycz - Biernacka
 Maria Klejdysz - Lewandowska
 Włodzimierz Bednarski - judge
 Andrzej Piszczatowski - Attorney Brok
 Paweł Nowisz - FSO manager
 Jerzy Kozakiewicz - Garwanko
 Jacek Domański - Tadzio Karski
 Jan Łopuszniak - Karter
 Teresa Violetta Buhl - woman conveying mouse statue
 Cezary Domagała - Krashan's college
 Aleksander Trąbczyński - Mroczek
 Barbara Dziekan - Bożena Mroczkowska
 Andrzej Grąziewicz - Woźniak
 Cezary Julski -
 Wiesława Mazurkiewicz - judge Zembrzuska
 Paweł Galia -
 Paweł Szczesny - Mr. Andrzej's man
 Grzegorz Wons - doctor
 Dariusz Odija - Skoczylas

External links

Polish comedy television series
Polish comedy-drama television series
1987 Polish television series endings
1986 Polish television series debuts
1980s Polish television series